Furball may refer to:

An alternative term for hairball, an accumulation of hair in the digestive tract of an animal
A large dog fight between groups of fighter aircraft
Furball, a computer game released on the Commodore Amiga
Furrball, a character from the cartoon Tiny Toon Adventures
A term of endearment for a kitten or cat